The Whipple-Lacey House, at 300 E. 17th St. in Cheyenne, Wyoming, was built in 1883.  It was listed on the National Register of Historic Places in 1980.

It includes elements of Stick/Eastlake style.

It was built by I.C. Whipple, an early Cheyenne banker, entrepreneur, and stockman. It was subsequently the home of Judge John W. Lacey, and in 1980, it was the A.H.E.P.A. Lodge No. 211, a lodge of the American Hellenic Educational Progressive Association.

References

National Register of Historic Places in Laramie County, Wyoming
Queen Anne architecture in Wyoming
Houses completed in 1883